The Vale of Wardour encompasses the valley of the River Nadder in the county of Wiltshire, England.

Geography

Topography 
The Vale of Wardour lies east of the town of Shaftesbury and is a relatively small but varied landscape. Named after the village of Wardour, its main river is the Nadder which flows from west to east through the vale. In the west the Nadder is fed by its main tributary, the Sem; in the east the valley ends around Wilton where the Nadder is joined by the Wylye. The largest village in the vale is Tisbury.

Natural region 
The vale is a western tongue of National Character Area 133: Blackmore Vale and Vale of Wardour, designated by Natural England. To the north is number 132, Salisbury Plain and West Wiltshire Downs, and to the south is number 134, Dorset Downs and Cranborne Chase. The area extends west almost as far as Barford St Martin, where the Nadder valley narrows.

Geology 
Geologically the Vale of Wardour is complex. The Nadder flows through a clay valley surrounded by hills of Purbeck, Portland, and Lower and Upper Greensand.The Gault, thickness  up to 27.5 m (90 ft.), is also present in the Vale, notable are the numerous phosphatic nodules it contains.

Sights 
 Ancient hillforts: Castle Rings and Castle Ditches
Fovant Badges
Old Wardour Castle
Philipps House

References 

Valleys of Wiltshire